The Hill is a documentary series on the Sundance Channel.  In the show Florida Congressman Robert Wexler opens his office doors to the cameras to expose the heated matters facing his constituents today. Directed by filmmaker and former Capitol Hill speechwriter and legislative aide Ivy Meeropol (granddaughter of Ethel and Julius Rosenberg), and produced by Roland Park Pictures, The Hill showcases Wexler’s conflicts both with the opposition and with his own political party on such charged issues as social security, prescription drugs, Medicare, Hurricane Katrina, and the war in Iraq.

Season one premiered on August 23, 2006.

References

External links 
 
 

2006 American television series debuts
2007 American television series endings
2000s American reality television series
2000s American documentary television series
Sundance TV original programming